The genera of plants within the tribe Stapelieae are all to varying degrees stem succulents.  Many of the species resemble cacti, though are not closely related, as an example of convergent evolution.  The stems are often angular, mostly four-angled in cross-section, but in some species there are six or more, with some species of Hoodia having more than thirty angles.  In size they vary from less than 2.5 cm/1" in length to over 2 m/6" tall.  The leaves are in most species reduced to rudiments, sometimes hardened and thorn-like, arranged on bumps or tubercles on the angles.  Some species, however, still have recognisable leaves, most notably the Indian species Frerea indica, and some members of Tridentea.  Stapeliads are most abundant in warm, dry climates.  In Africa, there are two separate regions where Stapeliads have most diversified: northeast Africa, and Southern Africa.  Several species are endemic to the small island of Socotra off the Horn of Africa.  The Arabian Peninsula, and most specifically the country of Yemen, contain another concentration of species.  Several more are found in the drier parts of Pakistan, Afghanistan, India, Nepal, and Myanmar.  A single species, Caralluma europea is found in Europe, in the very southern part of the Iberian peninsula and in the island of Lampedusa. Stapeliads are often regarded as a climax group within the family because of their often structurally complex flowers. Certain aspects of these reproductive parts mirror the pollination systems in the Orchid family and represent a case of parallel evolution though both groups are quite unrelated and have developed similar, though not identical means to achieve the ultimate goal of pollination and therefore reproduction.  Most stapeliads use flies as pollinators, that are attracted to odours resembling dung or rotting meat, emanating from the flowers. Many of the flowers also bear some physical resemblance to rotting animal carcasses, leading to their popular name of Carrion Flowers.  However, not all stapeliads smell bad, or attract flies.  Some species use beetles, bees, wasps, butterflies or moths as pollinators.  Stapeliad flowers range in size from mere millimetres in species of Echidnopsis and Pseudolithos to those of Stapelia gigantea that can reach 40 cm/16" in diameter, and are some the largest of flowers to be found on any species of succulent. 

Flowers are actinomorphic (radially symmetrical) with 5 free or fused sepals and petals. Some petals are formed in a shape of a star while some have a tubular shaped corolla. On some species, a raised ring or annulus is present in the center of the corolla. Instead of stamens and pistils, Stapeliads contain a pollinarium.

List of genera
 Angolluma
 Baynesia
 Caralluma
 Desmidorchis
 Duvalia
 Echidnopsis
 Edithcolea
 Frerea
 Hoodia
 Huernia
 Huerniopsis
 Larryleachia
 Notechidnopsis
 Orbea
 Orbeopsis
 Piaranthus
 Pachycymbium
 Pectinaria
 Pseudolithos
 Pseudopectinaria
 Quaqua
 Rhytidocaulon
 Stapelia
 Stapelianthus
 Stapeliopsis
 Tavaresia
 Tridentea
 Tromotriche
 Whitesloanea

References

   and 

Asclepiadoideae
Asterid tribes